Saint Clair (also Kilpatrick Estate) is an unincorporated community in Burke County, in the U.S. state of Georgia.

History
A post office called Saint Clair was established in 1832, and remained in operation until 1939. The community most likely was named after Arthur St. Clair (1737–1818), a U.S. revolutionary general.

References

Unincorporated communities in Burke County, Georgia
Unincorporated communities in Georgia (U.S. state)